On 31 January 2023, Tiba al-Ali was killed in Iraq in an apparent honour killing by her father.

Tiba al-Ali was born in Iraq in 2000 and moved to Turkey in 2017. She and her fiancé frequently made videos on YouTube about life in Istanbul. She visited her family in the central Iraqi city of Diwaniyah, Al-Qādisiyyah Governorate, in 2023, where on 31 January she was strangled and killed at night while sleeping. Her father, who objected to her living in Turkey, confessed to police that he was responsible for the murder. There are no laws in Iraq that prohibit domestic violence. Many media outlets have described it as a so-called honour killing.

In February, protests against the killing took place in Iraq. Activists gathered to demand a law against domestic violence and to bring attention to the issue of rising violence against women in the country.

See also 
Murder of Romina Ashrafi
Murder of Mona Heydari

References 

2020s crimes in Iraq
2023 in Iraq
Al-Qādisiyyah Governorate
Honor killing in Asia
Honor killing victims
January 2023 crimes in Asia